Dzmitry Asipenka (born 12 December 1982) is a Belarusian professional footballer who plays for Arsenal Dzerzhinsk.

Honours
Shakhtyor Soligorsk
Belarusian Cup winner: 2013–14

Individual
Belarusian Premier League top scorer: 2012

External links

1982 births
Living people
Footballers from Minsk
Belarusian footballers
Association football forwards
Belarusian expatriate footballers
Expatriate footballers in Ukraine
Belarusian expatriate sportspeople in Ukraine
Ukrainian Premier League players
FC Traktor Minsk players
FC SKVICH Minsk players
FC Smorgon players
FC Minsk players
FC Vorskla Poltava players
FC Shakhtyor Soligorsk players
FC Granit Mikashevichi players
FC Isloch Minsk Raion players
FC Luch Minsk (2012) players
FC Arsenal Dzerzhinsk players